The Sun Will Find Us is the second album by Canadian singer-songwriter Kate Maki, released in 2004. The album was released independently with distribution by Outside Music.

Guest musicians on the album include Nathan Lawr, Dale Murray, Ruth Minnikin and Ryan Bishops.

The song "To Get Across" was featured in the film Weirdsville from 2007, and also in Episode 6 of the television series Hard Rock Medical from 2013.

Track listing
 "First Impression"
 "One by One"
 "Wait in Rain"
 "Old Guitar"
 "Forever Blue"
 "Defend the End"
 "Another Storm"
 "Someone Better"
 "Sweet Time"
 "Mid March Blues"
 "To Get Across"

2004 albums
Kate Maki albums